“Glory, Glory” is a possible name for several works:

Songs
 “The Battle Hymn of the Republic”, an American patriotic anthem written by Julia Ward Howe in 1861
 To the same tune: “Glory Glory” (association football chant), which has been used notably by British clubs Manchester United, Hibernian, and Tottenham. Was also copied by rugby league outfit South Sydney Rabbitohs.
 “Glory, Glory” (fight song), sung at American college sporting events
  “Glory, Glory (Lay My Burden Down)”, American spiritual song, recorded by many artists (under several titles) since the 20th century
 "Glory! Glory!", by Underworld from Underneath the Radar, 1988

Films
 Glory! Glory!, a 1989 American comedy film
 Glory Glory (2000 film), a South African Western film